Maria Gowen (or Gowan) Brooks (pen name, A Lover of Fine Arts and Maria Del Occidente; 1794 – November 11, 1845) was an American poet. She impressed Edgar Allan Poe and the English Poet Laureate, Robert Southey, who promoted her best-known poem Zophiël.

Early life and education
Abigail Gowen was born in Medford, Massachusetts, 1794. Her father was a man of literary tastes, and she was exposed to a lot of poetry at home. By age nine, she had memorized a large quantity of prose. When Abigail was thirteen, her father died, bankrupt. She immediately came under the care of a Boston merchant named John Brooks. He was a man more than thirty years older than she was, to whom she had already been betrothed. She finished her education and married him.

Career
For a while she and John lived prosperously, but "financial reverses" eventually reduced them to living in comparative poverty. Abigail began to write poetry as consolation. Around this time, she changed her name to "Maria Abigail", which would eventually become, simply, "Maria". Also around this time, at age nineteen, she had written her first epic poem. It is described as a "metrical romance", which she never published.

In 1820, Brooks published a collection of her poetry, Judith, Esther, and other Poems, under the pseudonym "A Lover of Fine Arts". In 1823, the husband died, and Brooks went to live with her brother on his coffee plantation in Manzanas, Cuba. He died soon after her arrival, which left her with a "settled income". During this time, she began to write the poem she would become most famous for: Zophiël, or the Bride of Seven, based on the story of Sara in the Book of Tobit.

In 1824, Brooks made a sojourn to Canada, where she became engaged to a Canadian soldier she had met in New England (prior to John Brooks’ death). However, they became estranged, "through a series of misunderstandings", and Brooks subsequently attempted suicide, twice. Upon returning to the United States, in 1825, she published the first canto of Zophiël in Boston. In 1826, Brooks began a correspondence with the English Poet Laureate, Robert Southey, who praised her work heartily and gave her the pseudonym "Maria Del Occidente" (Maria of the West). He regarded her as "the most impassioned and imaginative of all poetesses", but time did not sustain this verdict.  She also caught the attention of Edgar Allan Poe. He, too, praised her work, and often mentioned her favorably in his literary reviews.

Brooks finished Zophiël in 1829, but did not publish it immediately. First, she took her son, Horace Brooks, to Hanover, New Hampshire, to try to enroll him at West Point. She was unsuccessful. However, in the same year, she visited Paris, and there met the Marquis de Lafayette, a man renowned for his heroic services in the American Revolutionary War. He was easily able to secure a position at West Point for Brooks's son, who went on to be modestly successful there.

In 1831, she went to England and spent a few weeks at Southey's home. There, he oversaw the publishing of Zophiël in London. She then returned to the United States and lived in New England for approximately twelve years. In 1843, she serially published a "prose account of her unhappy love affair", called Idomen; or, the Vale of Yumuri, in a Boston newspaper. In December of the same year, she returned to her Cuban estate and published another poem, Ode to the Departed.

She died in 1845, at age 51, of tropical fever. She had been working on a romance at the time, Beatriz, Beloved of Columbus, which was never published.  She was buried in Limonar Church Cemetery in Matanzas, Cuba.

References

Bibliography

Further reading
J. D. Grove, "Legacy Profile: Maria Gowen Brooks (c.1795-1845)", Legacy, 12 (1995): 38-46
Dennis Low, The Literary Protégées of the Lake Poets (Aldershot: Ashgate, 2006)
Ruth Shepard Graniss, An American Friend of Robert Southey (New York: [privately published], 1913).

External links
 
 
 
 "Book of Tobit"
 

1794 births
1845 deaths
American women poets
19th-century American poets
19th-century American women writers
People from Medford, Massachusetts
Poets from Massachusetts